Major Guy Temple Montacute Larnach-Nevill, 4th Marquess of Abergavenny, JP, DL (15 July 1883 – 30 March 1954) was a British peer.

Guy was the eldest son of Lord George Montacute Nevill and his wife Florence Mary Soanes.

He married Isabel Nellie Larnach (d. 5 November 1953), the only child of James Walker Larnach, on 30 October 1909, and had three children:
Lady Angela Isabel Nellie Nevill (1910–1980), who married the 7th Earl of Cottenham and was the mother of Charles Pepys, 8th Earl of Cottenham
Lt. Col. John Henry Guy Nevill, 5th Marquess of Abergavenny (1914–2000)
Lord Rupert Nevill (1923–1982)

After the death of his father-in-law, he changed his surname (for himself and his wife only) from Nevill to Larnach-Nevill by deed poll on 17 June 1919. He gained the rank of captain in the Scots Guards and gained the rank of honorary major in 1920 in the Sussex Yeomanry. He held the office of Deputy Lieutenant and also held the office of Justice of the Peace for Sussex. Larnach-Nevill succeeded to the marquessate in 1938 on the death of his uncle, Henry Nevill, 3rd Marquess of Abergavenny, who died with no surviving male issue. The 4th Marquess died in 1954 and was succeeded by his elder son, John.

His daughter Lady Angela Isabel married Digby Pepys, 7th Earl of Cottenham.

Notes

References

External links

 

Nevill, Guy Temple Monatcute
Larnach-Nevill, Guy Temple Montacute
04
Abergavenny, Guy Larnach-Nevill, 4th Marquess of
Guy
Scots Guards officers
English justices of the peace
British Army personnel of World War I
20th-century British landowners